Paul M. Sand (October 21, 1914 – December 8, 1984) was an American attorney and jurist who served as an associate jurist on the North Dakota Supreme Court from 1975 to 1984.

Early life and education 
Sand was born in Balta, North Dakota. He earned a Bachelor of Laws from the University of North Dakota School of Law.

Career 
He served in the United States Army during World War II, where he was assigned to the United States Army Judge Advocate General's Corps at in Berlin. He also worked for the United Nations War Crimes Commission. After retiring from the Army, Sand established a private legal practice in Rugby, North Dakota. He served as assistant North Dakota attorney general from 1949 to 1975.

1914 births
1984 deaths
20th-century American judges

References 

Justices of the North Dakota Supreme Court
People from Burleigh County, North Dakota
People from Pierce County, North Dakota
University of North Dakota alumni